Altolaterra is a quarter of Tagliacozzo in the Province of L'Aquila in the Abruzzo region of Italy.

Frazioni of Tagliacozzo